Norway participated in the Eurovision Song Contest 2010 with the song "My Heart Is Yours" written by Hanne Sørvaag and Fredrik Kempe. The song was performed by Didrik Solli-Tangen. In addition to participating in the contest, the Norwegian broadcaster Norsk rikskringkasting (NRK) also hosted the Eurovision Song Contest after winning the competition in 2009 with the song "Fairytale" performed by Alexander Rybak. NRK organised the national final Melodi Grand Prix 2010 in order to select the Norwegian entry for the 2010 contest in Oslo. "My Heart Is Yours" performed by Didrik Solli-Tangen was selected as the winner following a five-week-long competition consisting of three semi-finals, a Last Chance round and the final.

As the host country, Norway qualified to compete directly in the final of the Eurovision Song Contest. Performing in position 3 during the final, Norway placed twentieth out of the 25 participating countries with 35 points.

Before Eurovision

Hosting the Eurovision Song Contest 2010 
After winning the 2009 Contest, Norway became the host of the Eurovision Song Contest 2010 which took place in Bærum just outside Oslo. NRK announced that a total of 150 million kroner (€17,4 million) would be spent to host the contest. On 27 May 2009, NRK announced that the 2010 Contest would be held in the Oslo metropolitan area, arguing that Oslo was the only city with the required capacity, venues, and infrastructure to hold the show. After selecting two candidates for the show, NRK chose the newly constructed Telenor Arena, situated in the neighbouring municipality Bærum. This arena beat the Oslo Spektrum, the host of the 1996 Contest.

Melodi Grand Prix 2010 
Melodi Grand Prix 2010 was the 48th edition of the Norwegian national final Melodi Grand Prix and selected Norway's entry for the Eurovision Song Contest 2010. The competition consisted of three semi-finals, a Last Chance round and a final in different cities across Norway, hosted by Per Sundnes and Marte Stokstad. The shows were televised on NRK1 as well as streamed online at NRK's official website nrk.no.

Format 
The competition consisted of five shows: three semi-finals on 8, 16 and 23 January 2010, the Last Chance round on 30 January 2010 and a final on 6 February 2010. Seven songs competed in each semi-final and the top two entries proceeded directly to the final, while the songs that placed third and fourth proceeded to the Last Chance round. The two fifth-placed acts from the semi-finals with the most votes also proceeded to the Last Chance round as wildcards. An additional two entries qualified from the Last Chance round to the final. The results in the semi-finals and Last Chance round were determined exclusively by public televoting. The results in the final were determined by public televoting and four regional juries.

Competing entries 
A submission period was opened by NRK between 6 July 2009 and 1 September 2009. Songwriters were required to hold Norwegian citizenship or have permanent residency in Norway. Collaborations with foreign songwriters were permitted as long as half of the composition were by Norwegian songwriters. NRK also reserved the right to choose the performers of the selected songs in consultation with the songwriters and directly invite certain artists and composers to compete in addition to the public call for submissions. At the close of the deadline, over 1,000 submissions were received. Twenty-one songs were selected for the competition by a jury panel. The competing songs were revealed on 27 November 2009, while the artists were revealed between 2 and 17 December 2009. 30-second clips of the competing entries in each semi-final were released on 4, 11 and 17 December 2009, respectively, while the songs in their entirety were premiered via radio on NRK P1 on 7, 14 and 20 January, respectively.

Semi-final 1 
Seven songs competed during the first semi-final on 8 January 2010 at Hangar E of the Ørland Hovedflystasjon in Ørland. "Make My Day" performed by Maria Haukaas Storeng and "The Dragontower" performed by Keep of Kalessin qualified directly to the final, while "" performed by Gaute Ormåsen and "Yes Man" performed by Bjørn Johan Muri proceeded to the Last Chance round. On 25 January 2010, "Rewind Love" performed by Johnny Hide was revealed as one of the two fifth-placed entries with the most votes and proceeded to the Last Chance round as a wildcard.

Semi-final 2 
Seven songs competed during the second semi-final on 16 January 2010 at Bodø Spektrum in Bodø. "The Touch" performed by Maria Arredondo and "Give It To Me" performed by Alexander Stenerud qualified directly to the final, while "Jealous 'Cause I Love You" performed by Venke Knutson and "The Best of Me Is You" performed by Heine Totland proceeded to the Last Chance round. On 25 January 2010, "Life Is Here Today" performed by Skanksters was revealed as one of the two fifth-placed entries with the most votes and proceeded to the Last Chance round as a wildcard.

Semi-final 3 
Seven songs competed during the third semi-final on 23 January 2010 at Skien Fritidspark in Skien. "My Heart Is Yours" performed by Didrik Solli-Tangen and "Don't Wanna Lose You Again" performed by A1 qualified directly to the final, while "I'll Take You High" performed by Mira Craig and "Tokyo Night" performed by Karoline Garfjell Rundberg proceeded to the Last Chance round.

Last Chance round 
The Last Chance round took place on 30 January 2010 at the Sparta Amfi in Sarpsborg. The six entries that placed third and fourth in the preceding four semi-finals alongside the two wildcards competed and the results were determined over two rounds of voting. In the first round, the eight entries competed in four duels and the winners of each duel were selected to proceed to the second round: "Yes Man" performed by Bjørn Johan Muri, "" performed by Gaute Ormåsen, "I'll Take You High" performed by Mira Craig and "Jealous 'Cause I Love You" performed by Venke Knutson. In the second round, the four entries competed in two duels and the winners of each duel, "Yes Man" performed by Bjørn Johan Muri and "Jealous 'Cause I Love You" performed by Venke Knutson, proceeded to the final.

Final 
Eight songs consisting of the six semi-final qualifiers alongside two qualifiers from the Last Chance round competed during the final on 6 February 2010 at the Oslo Spektrum in Oslo. The winner was selected over two rounds of voting. In the first round, the top four entries were selected by public televoting to proceed to the second round, the Gold Final. In the Gold Final, four regional juries from the four semi-final and Last Chance round host cities awarded 2,000, 4,000, 6,000 and 8,000 points to their top four songs. The results of the public televote were revealed by Norway's regions and added to the jury scores, leading to the victory of "My Heart Is Yours" performed by Didrik Solli-Tangen with 466,675 votes. In addition to the performances of the competing entries, the interval acts featured a performance by Norwegian Eurovision Song Contest 2009 winner Alexander Rybak.

At Eurovision 
As the winner of the Eurovision Song Contest 2009 and host of the 2010 Contest, Norway automatically qualified for a place in the final, held on 29 May 2010. In addition to their participation in the final, Norway was assigned to vote in the second semi-final on 27 May 2010.

Norway was drawn to perform 3rd in the final performed following Spain and preceding Moldova. The country placed 20th in the final, scoring 35 points. The public awarded Norway 21st place with 18 points and the jury awarded 17th place with 61 points.

Voting

Points awarded to Norway

Points awarded by Norway

References

External links 
  Official Melodi Grand Prix 2010 site NRK
Full national final on nrk.no

2010
Countries in the Eurovision Song Contest 2010
2010
Eurovision
Eurovision